In Dzogchen, the eleven vajra topics explain the view of the secret instruction series (man ngag sde). These can be found in the String of Pearls Tantra (Mu tig phreng ba), the Great Commentary by Vimalamitra as well as in Longchenpa's Treasury of Word and Meaning (Tsik Dön Dzö). The String of Pearls Tantra briefly lists them as follows:

The eleven topics are:

 the ground or basis of reality (gzhi), and how it dynamically manifests itself (gzhi snang)
 how beings stray from the basis
 the essence of enlightenment present in all beings
 how primordial wisdom (ye shes) is in all beings
 the pathways of primordial wisdom in beings
 the gateways of primordial wisdom in beings
 the objective sphere for primordial wisdom shining forth
 how primordial wisdom is experientially accessed through contemplation
 signs of realization
 dying and post-death Opportunities in the intermediate states (bar do)
 ultimate fruition (Buddhahood)

References

Citations

Works cited
 
 

Dzogchen
Tibetan Buddhist philosophical concepts